The 1937 Penn State Nittany Lions football team represented the Pennsylvania State College in the 1937 college football season. The team was led by eighth-year head coach Bob Higgins and played its home games in New Beaver Field in State College, Pennsylvania.

Schedule

References

Penn State
Penn State Nittany Lions football seasons
Penn State Nittany Lions football